Jessica Miller (born March 1, 1981 in Westerville, Ohio, U.S.) is a retired pair skater who represented Canada in international competition for much of her career. She teamed up with Ian Moram in 2002. Miller and Moram trained at the BC Centre of Excellence and were coached by Bruno Marcotte. They announced their retirement from competitive skating on May 9, 2008.

Miller previously competed for the United States with Jeffrey Weiss and Kevin Garrett.

Miller has dual citizenship with the United States and Canada.

Competitive highlights

With Moram for Canada

With Weiss for the United States

With Garrett for the United States

Programs 
(with Moram)

References

External links
 
 Miller & Moram Fansite

1981 births
Living people
American female pair skaters
Canadian female pair skaters
American expatriate sportspeople in Canada